Kerriochloa is a genus of Southeast Asian plants in the grass family. The only known species is Kerriochloa siamensis, native to Thailand and Vietnam.

The genus name of Kerriochloa is in honour of Arthur Francis George Kerr (1877–1942), an Irish medical doctor. The Latin specific epithet of siamensis means coming from Siam (the old name for Thailand.
Both genus and species were first described and published in Hooker's Icon. Pl. Vol.35 on table 3494 in 1950.

References

Andropogoneae
Monotypic Poaceae genera
Plants described in 1950
Flora of Thailand
Flora of Vietnam